Carl Bolle or Karl Bolle may refer to:

 Carl Bolle (naturalist) (also as Karl Bolle) (1821–1909), German naturalist whose standard abbreviation as a botanist is "Bolle"
  (1832–1910), German entrepreneur and diarist
 Karl Bolle (flying ace) (1893–1955), German entrepreneur and flying ace

See also 
 Bolle (disambiguation)